Muar Second Bridge (Malay: Jambatan Kedua Muar Jawi: جمبتن كدوا موار) is a famous landmark in Muar, Johor, Malaysia. It crosses the Muar River.

History
Between the 1990s to 2000s, traffic congestion was prevalent at the Sultan Ismail Bridge since the official opening of the North–South Expressway Southern Route between Ayer Keroh and Pagoh and the opening of the Tangkak and Pagoh Interchange on April 1, 1989. In 1998, the federal government announced that a second bridge would be built at Parit Bunga to ease traffic congestion on the existing bridge.

The bridge was constructed between March 2001 and June 2003. It was built by Public Works Department of Malaysia (JKR) while the main contractor was Ranhill Bersekutu Sdn Bhd. The bridge was officially opened to traffic on 2004 alongside the opening of the Muar Bypass.

Bridge Descriptions
The Muar Second Bridge is a 632-metre semi-harp cable-stayed bridge with a 132-metre mid-span across Muar River, similar in design to the Sunshine Skyway Bridge in Tampa Bay, Florida, in the United States, and Prai River Bridge in Penang, Malaysia. The bridge project also features a complex interchange at Parit Bunga, the first in the town.

See also
 Muar
 Sungai Muar
 Muar Bypass
 Jambatan Sultan Ismail

References

Bridges in Johor
Bridges completed in 2003
Cable-stayed bridges in Malaysia
Muar District